José Riesgo (8 September 1919 – 16 May 2002) was a Spanish actor. After fighting in the Spanish Civil War for the Spanish Republican Army, he began acting in 1943. He played Julián in Barrio Sésamo. He died on 16 May 2002.

Filmography

Films

TV

References

External links

 

1919 births
2002 deaths
Male actors from Madrid
Spanish male film actors
Spanish male television actors
20th-century Spanish male actors
Male Spaghetti Western actors